Progesterex is a fictitious date rape drug that would purportedly cause sterilization. It is part of a hoax that began to circulate in 1999 via e-mail on the internet. No actual drug by this name or even with these properties exists, and no such incident has ever been documented or confirmed. The most high profile person falling for the hoax was British MP Lynne Featherstone, who asked a question about the fake drug in Parliament.

Email contents
Typical contents of the e-mail hoax are as follows, although different versions tend to turn up over time:

Debunking
There is no "sterilization pill" under any name that exists for sterilizing horses. Sterilization of male horses is performed surgically, while mares are usually left unaltered.

Notable examples
A version of this e-mail was translated and sent around in Brazil in 2008–2009.

A version of this hoax also made the rounds via bulletins on MySpace, Bebo, Facebook, and Tagged and in the form of a group named "Heads Up Ladies".

According to the Spanish language website VSAntirus.com at least two versions in Spanish have made the rounds since 2001 as well.

A Swedish and later Norwegian version circulated 2008–2009 with a signature of Birgitta Olofsson, Dr Med in nursing science of Umeå University.

UK Parliament incident
On 18 April 2006 UK Member of Parliament Lynne Featherstone submitted a Written Question to the Home Secretary on whether the Home Office had calculated the number of date rape incidences that had been connected with Progesterex. Home Office Minister Paul Goggins replied that "Progesterex does not exist".

Featherstone criticised the government stating they "need to do more to discover the unearthly monster who sends them out" and that "their cavalier attitude will not do." However, critics such as fellow Liberal Democrat James Graham castigated Featherstone's conduct in "criticising the Home Office for not having a response to made up drugs and made up crimes", stating "trivialising rape in this way without bothering to do basic research first doesn’t help anybody".

Many see the incident as having strong parallels with a previous case where MP David Amess asked a question in Parliament about a fictitious drug called "Cake".

See also
 Brass Eye

References

External links
 Urbanlegends.about.com article on the Progesterex Urban Legend  	
 Snopes.com article on the Progesterex Urban Legend 	
 GoAskAlice!: "Progesterex": Horse and Human Sterilizer, date rape drug, or Urban Legend? 	
 Hoax: Progesterex. La droga de los violadores 	
 Indonesian Hoaxes – Progesterex (Obat Sterilisasi Hewan) berdampak Pemerkosaan!  (Indonesian Language) 	

Internet hoaxes
Sexual urban legends
Hoaxes about drugs
1999 hoaxes
Drugs in the United Kingdom
Fictional medicines and drugs